The Hermitage of Nuestra Señora de los Santos (Spanish: Ermita de Nuestra Señora de los Santos) is a hermitage located in Móstoles, Spain. It was declared Bien de Interés Cultural in 1994.

References 

Christian hermitages in Spain
Buildings and structures in Móstoles
Bien de Interés Cultural landmarks in the Community of Madrid